Esko Alpo Luostarinen (born May 8, 1935, in Viipuri, Finland) is a retired professional ice hockey player who played in the SM-liiga.  He played for Tappara and at two Olympic games. He competed at the 1960 Winter Olympics and the 1964 Winter Olympics.

He was inducted into the Finnish Hockey Hall of Fame in 1985.

References 

1935 births
Living people
Finnish ice hockey players
Ice hockey players at the 1960 Winter Olympics
Ice hockey players at the 1964 Winter Olympics
Olympic ice hockey players of Finland
Sportspeople from Vyborg
Tappara players